St. Paul African Methodist Episcopal Church, 3345 North Haverhill Road, West Palm Beach, Florida, is a historic church, founded in 1900 by Rev. Charles Long, Sr. It was founded when African-American families were "forced to move" from Palm Beach. Its first name was Gethsemane, and it was first located in the Pleasant City neighborhood.

References

African Methodist Episcopal churches in Florida
Churches in Palm Beach County, Florida
Buildings and structures in West Palm Beach, Florida
1900 establishments in Florida
West Palm Beach, Florida
African-American history of Florida